Merville may refer to:

Communes in France
 Merville, Haute-Garonne, in the Haute-Garonne département
 Merville, Nord, in the Nord département
 Merville-Franceville-Plage, in the Calvados département

Other places
 Merville Garden Village, Newtownabbey, County Antrim, Northern Ireland
 Merville, British Columbia
 Merville Dairy, a former Irish milk distribution company based in Finglas, Dublin that merged with other companies to form Premier Dairies
Merville, Parañaque, a barangay in Parañaque, Metro Manila

People
 Merville (playwright), French 19th-century playwright